CQ is a code used by wireless operators, particularly those communicating in Morse code,, but also by voice operators, to make a general call (called a CQ call). Transmitting the letters CQ on a particular radio frequency is an invitation for any operators listening on that frequency to respond. It is still widely used in amateur radio.

History and usage

The CQ call was originally used by landline telegraphy operators in the United Kingdom. French was, and still is, the official language for international postal services, and the word sécurité was used to mean "safety" or "pay attention". It is still used in this sense in international telecommunications. It sounds also like the French "c'est qui?", which means "who's there?". In English-speaking countries, the origin of the abbreviation was popularly changed to the phrase "seek you" or, later, when used in the CQD distress call, "Calling all distress".

CQ was adopted by the Marconi Company in 1904 for use in wireless telegraphy by spark-gap transmitter, and was adopted internationally at the 1912 London International Radiotelegraph Convention, and is still used.

A variant of the CQ call, CQD, was the first code used as a distress signal.  It was proposed by the Marconi Company and adopted in 1904, but was replaced between 1906 and 1908 by the SOS code.  When the Titanic sank in 1912, it initially transmitted the distress call "CQD DE MGY" (with "MGY" being the ship's call sign). Titanic'''s radio operator subsequently alternated between SOS and CQD calls afterwards.

In amateur radio usage, a CQ call can be qualified by appending more letters, as in CQ DX (meaning "calling all stations located in a different continent to the caller"), or the ITU call sign prefix for a particular country (e.g. CQ VK for "calling Australia").  The originator of the call can be identified by appending the letters DE (French for "from", also means "this is...") and the call sign of the transmitting station.

In the use of single-sideband (SSB) voice or CW mode (morse code telegraphy), an amateur radio operator often makes a general call by transmitting CQ repeatedly (such as "CQ CQ CQ") so that other operators scanning for such calls are aided by the familiar rhythmic sound in quickly discriminating distant (weak signal) general callers from other traffic and spurious emissions.  This technique allows the other operators to zero-in as close to the caller's center frequency using the human ear to fine-tune their transceiver before engaging the caller in a two-way communication.

The use of a CQ call is almost always used in single-sideband (SSB) voice or CW mode (morse code telegraphy).  Unlike FM mode, in the SSB voice and CW mode areas of the amateur radio bands operators are free to center their transmissions where it is most optimal (such as away from adjacent traffic that can interfere) and not expected to use whole-number, divisible-by-five, or otherwise channelized center frequencies.  CQ is constantly used on the HF shortwave amateur bands but very rarely used in the FM voice mode of transmission or on FM repeaters common on the VHF and UHF local bands since tuning of a repeater or FM signal does not require the aid of human perception to perfectly tune the signal.

The code was used as part of the chorus to the song "Communications" by Slim Gaillard.

See also
 Amateur radio
 CQ Amateur Radio, English-language magazine
 CQ ham radio'', Japanese-language magazine
 Q codes
 Universal Postal Union

References

General references
 
 
 
 

Amateur radio
Morse code
Radio communications
Operating signals